Daryna Apanashchenko (born 16 May 1986) is a Ukrainian footballer, who plays as a striker for Ankara BB Fomget GSK and the Ukraine women's national football team. For 14 years she played in Russia for Russian Women's Football Championship teams Energiya Voronezh, Ryazan VDV, and Zvezda Perm.

Club career 
Apanashchenko started her career at the capital team Kyivska Rus when she was 15 years old in 2001. In a 2010 interview Apanashchenko stated that women's football was completely ignored in Ukraine at that time.

In the 2008–09 UEFA Women's Cup semi-final second leg at Umeå she scored two goals that sealed Zvezda's surprising qualification for the final. She also scored Zvezda's only goal in the two-legged final.

In March 2022, she moved to Turkey and joined Ankara-based club Fomget FSK to play in the second half of the 2021-22 Women's Super League. She scored three goals in ten league matches of the 2021-22 season.

International career 
Apanashchenko won her first cap for the Ukraine national team on 12 May 2002, as an 88th-minute substitute in a 1–1 2003 FIFA Women's World Cup qualification (UEFA) draw with Norway in Boryspil.

She scored three goals in the qualifying stage for UEFA Women's Euro 2009, including winners against Denmark and Scotland, and contributed further to Ukraine's qualification for the tournament scoring three more goals in the play-off against Slovenia. In the final tournament she scored again against Denmark, but that time it was not enough to win the match. In 2013 she was appointed national team captain.

By June 2019 Apanashchenko had amassed over 100 international appearances and more than 50 goals. In April 2021, she scored in Ukraine's UEFA Women's Euro 2022 qualifying play-offs tie against Northern Ireland – her 61st goal in her 122nd appearance – but Ukraine were beaten 4–1 on aggregate.

International goals 
Scores and results list Ukraine's goal tally first.

Honours 
Lehenda Chernihiv
 Ukrainian Women's League (2) 2001, 2002
 Women's Cup (2) 2001, 2002

Zvezda Perm
 Russian Women's Leagues (3) 2014, 2015, 2017
 Russian Women's Cup (4) 2012, 2013, 2015, 2016,

Zhytlobud-1 Kharkiv
 Russian Women's Cup (4) 2012 (1) 2018
Individual
 Russian Women's Leagues Top Scorer (3) 2009, 2014, 2015 
 Ukrainian Woman Footballer of the Year: (6) 2009, 2010, 2015, 2016, 2017, 2018, 2019
 Ukrainian Women's League Footballer of the Year: 2018

References

External links 
 

1986 births
Living people
Sportspeople from Kryvyi Rih
Ukrainian women's footballers
WFC Lehenda-ShVSM Chernihiv players
Ukrainian expatriate women's footballers
Expatriate women's footballers in Russia
Ukrainian expatriate sportspeople in Russia
FC Energy Voronezh players
Ryazan-VDV players
Zvezda 2005 Perm players
WFC Zhytlobud-1 Kharkiv players
WFC Kyivska Rus Kyiv players
Ukraine women's international footballers
Women's association football forwards
FIFA Century Club
Ukrainian expatriate sportspeople in Turkey
Expatriate women's footballers in Turkey
Turkish Women's Football Super League players
Fomget Gençlik ve Spor players